Moorhampton railway station was a station in the hamlet of Moorhampton, to the east of Norton Canon, Herefordshire, England. The station was opened for freight traffic on 24 October 1862 and closed on 31 December 1962. The station, now a caravan site, was on the B4230 Station Road.

References

Further reading

Disused railway stations in Herefordshire
Railway stations in Great Britain opened in 1862
Railway stations in Great Britain closed in 1962
Former Midland Railway stations